Tin(IV) nitrate is a salt of tin with nitric acid. It is a volatile white solid, subliming at 40 °C under a vacuum. Unlike other nitrates, it reacts with water to produce nitrogen dioxide.

Structure
It is structurally very similar to titanium(IV) nitrate, with the only major difference being the Sn–O bond(2.161 Å) being slightly longer than the Ti–O bond(2.068 Å).

Production
It was first prepared in the 1960s. Tin(IV) chloride was added to dinitrogen pentoxide  at -78 °C, which produced tin(IV) nitrate and nitryl chloride:
SnCl4 + 4 N2O5 → Sn(NO3)4 + 4 NO2Cl
Attempts to prepare this compound by reacting tin(II) oxide and nitric acid resulted in a formation of tin(II) nitrate hydroxide.

Reactions
This compound is sensitive to water, it hydrolyzes into tin(IV) oxide and nitrogen dioxide.
Tin(IV) nitrate reacts with trifloroacetic acid anhydride to yield (NO2+)2[Sn(OOCCF3)62−] which is a nitronium salt. With trifluoroacetic acid a similar compound solvated with trifluoroacetic acid is produced.

It also reacts with acetic anhydride or acetic acid to produce tin(IV) acetate and with nitric oxide to produce tin(IV) oxynitrate.

The reaction of tin(IV) nitrate with triphenylphosphine and triphenylarsine yields dinitratotin(IV)bis(diphenylphosphonate) and dinitratotin(IV)bis(diphenylarsonate).

References

Tin(IV) compounds
Nitrates